This list is of the Cultural Properties of Japan designated in the category of  for the Prefecture of Miyazaki.

National Cultural Properties
As of 1 July 2019, zero properties have been designated Important Cultural Properties as being of national significance.

Prefectural Cultural Properties
As of 1 May 2019, four properties have been designated at a prefectural level.

See also
 Cultural Properties of Japan
 List of National Treasures of Japan (paintings)
 Japanese painting
 List of Historic Sites of Japan (Miyazaki)

References

External links
  Cultural Properties in Miyazaki Prefecture

Cultural Properties,Miyazaki
Paintings
Paintings,Miyazaki
Lists of paintings